Wuchang (吴场镇) is a town in Jiajiang County, Sichuan, China.

See also 
 List of township-level divisions of Sichuan

References 

Towns in Sichuan
Jiajiang County